In mathematics, a rigged Hilbert space (Gelfand triple, nested Hilbert space, equipped Hilbert space) is a construction designed to link the distribution and square-integrable aspects of functional analysis. Such spaces were introduced to study spectral theory in the broad sense. They bring together the 'bound state' (eigenvector) and 'continuous spectrum', in one place.

Motivation

A function such as the canonical homomorphism of the real line into the complex plane

is an eigenfunction of the differential operator

on the real line R, but isn't square-integrable for the usual Borel measure on R. To properly consider this function as an eigenfunction requires some way of stepping outside the strict confines of the Hilbert space theory. This was supplied by the apparatus of Schwartz distributions, and a generalized eigenfunction theory was developed in the years after 1950.

Functional analysis approach

The concept of rigged Hilbert space places this idea in an abstract functional-analytic framework.  Formally, a rigged Hilbert space consists of a Hilbert space H, together with a subspace Φ which carries a finer topology, that is one for which the natural inclusion

is continuous.  It is no loss to assume that Φ is dense in H for the Hilbert norm. We consider the inclusion of dual spaces H* in Φ*. The latter, dual to Φ in its 'test function' topology, is realised as a space of distributions or generalised functions of some sort, and the linear functionals on the subspace Φ of type

for v in H are faithfully represented as distributions (because we assume Φ dense).

Now by applying the Riesz representation theorem we can identify H* with H. Therefore, the definition of rigged Hilbert space is in terms of a sandwich:

The most significant examples are those for which Φ is a nuclear space; this comment is an abstract expression of the idea that Φ consists of test functions and Φ* of the corresponding distributions. Also, a simple example is given by Sobolev spaces: Here (in the simplest case of Sobolev spaces on ) 

where .

Formal definition (Gelfand triple)

A rigged Hilbert space is a pair (H,Φ) with H a Hilbert space, Φ a dense subspace, such that Φ is given a topological vector space structure for which the inclusion map i is continuous.

Identifying H with its dual space H*, the adjoint to i is the map

The duality pairing between Φ and Φ* is then compatible with the inner product on H, in the sense that:

In the case of complex Hilbert spaces, we use a Hermitian inner product; it will be complex linear in u (math convention) or v (physics convention), and conjugate-linear (complex anti-linear) in the other variable.

The triple  is often named the "Gelfand triple"  (after the mathematician Israel Gelfand).

Note that even though Φ is isomorphic to Φ* (via Riesz representation) if it happens that Φ is a Hilbert space in its own right, this isomorphism is not the same as the composition of the inclusion i with its adjoint i*

References

 J.-P. Antoine, Quantum Mechanics Beyond Hilbert Space (1996), appearing in Irreversibility and Causality, Semigroups and Rigged Hilbert Spaces, Arno Bohm, Heinz-Dietrich Doebner, Piotr Kielanowski, eds., Springer-Verlag, . (Provides a survey overview.)
 J. Dieudonné, Éléments d'analyse VII (1978). (See paragraphs 23.8 and 23.32)
 I. M. Gelfand and N. Ya. Vilenkin. Generalized Functions, vol. 4: Some Applications of Harmonic Analysis. Rigged Hilbert Spaces. Academic Press, New York, 1964.
 K. Maurin, Generalized Eigenfunction Expansions and Unitary Representations of Topological Groups, Polish Scientific Publishers, Warsaw, 1968.
 R. de la Madrid, "Quantum Mechanics in Rigged Hilbert Space Language," PhD Thesis (2001).
 R. de la Madrid, "The role of the rigged Hilbert space in Quantum Mechanics," Eur. J. Phys. 26, 287 (2005); quant-ph/0502053.
 

Generalized functions
Hilbert space
Spectral theory
Schwartz distributions